The Nikaia Olympic Weightlifting Hall is an indoor arena in Nikaia, in Piraeus. It hosted the  weightlifting events at the 2004 Summer Olympics in Greece. The venue was officially opened on August 14, 2004, the day after the beginning of the Games. The building had a capacity of 5,100, though only 3,500 seats are publicly available for the games.

History
After the 2004 Olympics, the facility has hosted fencing competitions, but was recently turned over to the University of Piraeus, for use as an academic lecture and conference center.

References

Indoor arenas in Greece
Venues of the 2004 Summer Olympics
Sports venues in Piraeus
Olympic weightlifting venues
Nikaia-Agios Ioannis Rentis
Weightlifting in Greece